The Nickelodeon Philippines Kids' Choice Awards was an annual awards show which brought honors year's biggest TV and sports personalities voted by kids and teenagers through text and online voting. Nickelodeon, a US cable television network, brought Kids' Choice Awards to the Philippines in an effort to strengthen its presence in Asia. According to Amit Jain, executive Vice-President and managing director of MTV Networks India, China and Southeast Asia, "This is a milestone for Nickelodeon's business in Southeast Asia as it will deliver on Nick's commitment
of providing global kids-centric shows and properties which are adapted to reflect local tastes and aspirations."

Host Cities
 2004 - Glorietta, Makati
 2006-2008 - Aliw Theater, Pasay

Hosts
 2008 - Michael V.

Nominees
There are a total 7 categories, with 5 nominees each for the 2008 Kids' Choice Awards.

Favourite Actress
 Kim Chiu (winner)
 Angel Locsin
 Iza Calzado
 Marian Rivera
 Sarah Geronimo

Favourite Actor
 Dingdong Dantes (winner)
 Gerald Anderson
 John Lloyd Cruz
 Piolo Pascual
 Richard Gutierrez

Favourite Television Show
 MariMar (winner)
 Bubble Gang
 Goin' Bulilit
 The Singing Bee
 Zaido: Pulis Pangkalawakan

Favourite Athlete
 Chris Tiu (winner)
 Manny Pacquiao
 Miguel Molina
 Efren "Bata" Reyes
 Japoy Lizardo

Favourite Musical Act
 Christian Bautista (winner)
 Gary Valenciano
 Parokya ni Edgar
 Sandwich
 Yeng Constantino
 Charice Pempengco

Favourite Cartoon
 SpongeBob SquarePants (winner)
 Avatar: The Legend of Aang
 Ben 10
 Dora the Explorer
 Tom and Jerry

Pinoy Wannabe Award
 KC Concepcion (winner)
 Charice Pempengco
 Lea Salonga
 Marc Nelson
 Vhong Navarro

See also

 List of Asian television awards

References

Awards established in 2004
Awards disestablished in 2008
Children's television awards
Nickelodeon Kids' Choice Awards
Philippine television awards